Patterson House, or Patterson Farmhouse or Patterson Farm may refer to:

Walter Patterson House, Clinton, Arkansas, listed on the National Register of Historic Places (NRHP) in Arkansas
George Washington Patterson Ranch-Ardenwood, Fremont, California, listed on the NRHP in California
Croke-Patterson-Campbell Mansion, Denver, Colorado, listed on the NRHP in Colorado
Patterson House (Fort Collins, Colorado), NRHP-listed in Larimer County 
Patterson-Turner Homeplace, Hartwell, Georgia, listed on the NRHP in Georgia
Lapham-Patterson House, Thomasville, Georgia, listed on the NRHP in Georgia
J. W. Patterson House, Fairmount, Indiana, listed on the NRHP in Indiana
Patterson House (Larned, Kansas), listed on the NRHP in Kansas
Neville-Patterson-Lamkin House, Arlington, Kentucky, listed on the NRHP in Kentucky 
Charles Patterson House (Frankfort, Kentucky), listed on the NRHP in Kentucky
Thomas Patterson House, Hodgenville, Kentucky, listed on the NRHP in Kentucky
Horace Patterson House, Lewisport, Kentucky, listed on the NRHP in Kentucky
Joseph Patterson Quarters, Midway, Kentucky, listed on the NRHP in Kentucky
Patterson House (Paintsville, Kentucky), listed on the NRHP in Kentucky
Patterson, John, and Eliza Barr, House, Canton, Michigan, listed on the NRHP in Michigan 
Patterson-Hernandez House, Barnesville, Minnesota, listed on the NRHP in Minnesota
Charles Patterson House (Natchez, Mississippi), listed on the NRHP in Mississippi
Elisha and Lucy Patterson Farmstead Historic District, Florissant, Missouri, listed on the NRHP in Missouri 
Patterson Farmhouse (Delmar, New York), listed on the NRHP in New York
John E. Patterson House, Fayetteville, North Carolina, listed on the NRHP in North Carolina
Gilmore-Patterson Farm, St. Paul's, North Carolina, listed on the NRHP in North Carolina 
Samuel N. Patterson House, Xenia, Ohio, listed on the NRHP in Ohio
A. W. Patterson House, Muskogee, Oklahoma, listed on the NRHP in Oklahoma
Christian-Patterson Rental Property, Eugene, Oregon, listed on the NRHP in Oregon
Patterson-Stratton House Eugene, Oregon, listed on the NRHP in Oregon
Samuel Patterson House, New Alexandria, Pennsylvania, listed on the NRHP in Pennsylvania
Burd Patterson House, Pottsville, Pennsylvania, listed on the NRHP in Pennsylvania
Patterson Brothers Commercial Building and House, Valley Falls, Rhode Island, listed on the NRHP in Rhode Island
Alexander Patterson House, Ten Mile, Tennessee, listed on the NRHP in Tennessee
Stanley Patterson Hall, Dallas, Texas, listed on the NRHP in Texas
Patterson Mansion in Washington, D.C., former home of the Washington Club

See also
Charles Patterson House (disambiguation)